Arthur Wilson "Slick" Morton Jr. (June 12, 1914 – April 19, 1999) was an American football player and coach. He was the head football coach at Southeastern Louisiana University (1942), the Virginia Military Institute (1947–1948), and Mississippi State University (1949–1951), compiling a career college football record of 22–31–2.

Playing career
Morton led Tallulah High School to back-to-back Louisiana state football championships in 1932 and 1933. Morton was personally recruited by Huey Long to attend Louisiana State University (LSU), where he lettered for the LSU Tigers football team from 1935 through 1937 and was captain of the 1937 squad.

Coaching career

High school
Morton began his coaching career in 1938 at Saint Stanislaus College, a Catholic prep school in Bay St. Louis, Mississippi. There he mentored Doc Blanchard, who went on to win the Heisman Trophy in 1945 playing for Army. In 1939, Morton move to Bogalusa High School in Bogalusa, Louisiana, where he served as head football coach for three seasons.

Southeastern Louisiana
Morton's first head coaching position was the fifth head coach at Southeastern Louisiana University and he held that position for the 1942 season. His coaching record at Southeastern Louisiana was 5–5 .

VMI
Morton was named the 19th head coach for the Keydets and he held that position for two seasons, from 1947 until 1948. His career coaching record at VMI was 9–8–1.

Later life
After his coaching days, Morton moved to Greenwood, Mississippi, entering business as a general contractor.

Head coaching record

College

References

External links
 

1914 births
1999 deaths
American football halfbacks
LSU Tigers football coaches
LSU Tigers football players
Mississippi State Bulldogs football coaches
Southeastern Louisiana Lions football coaches
VMI Keydets football coaches
High school football coaches in Louisiana
High school football coaches in Mississippi
People from Caddo Parish, Louisiana
People from Greenwood, Mississippi
People from Tallulah, Louisiana
Coaches of American football from Louisiana
Players of American football from Louisiana